Rushmore may refer to:

Places
Mount Rushmore, South Dakota, in the United States
Rushmore, Minnesota, a small city in the United States
Rushmore, Ohio, an unincorporated community
Rushmore Cave, south-east of the mountain
Rushmore Hundred, a former hundred (geographic division) in Dorset, England

People 

 Charles E. Rushmore (1857–1931), American businessman and attorney, namesake of the mountain
 Frederick Margetson Rushmore (1869–1933), British academic, Master of St Catharine's College, Cambridge from 1927 to 1933
 Howard Rushmore (1913–1958), American journalist
 Vivian Rushmore, American stage actress in the 1910s

Ships
USS Rushmore (LSD-14), a US Navy dock landing ship of World War II
USS Rushmore (LSD-47), a US Navy dock landing ship

Entertainment
Rushmore (film), a 1998 motion picture directed by Wes Anderson
Rushmore (soundtrack), the soundtrack album to the film
Rushmore Records, a record label

Other uses
Rushmore University, an unaccredited institute of higher learning on the Cayman Islands
Rushmore Mall, a shopping mall in Rapid City, South Dakota
Rushmore Memorial Library, Highland Mills, New York
Cassandra Rushmore, character in Australian soap opera Neighbours
Code name of Foxpro's optimizing database engine

See also
Rushmere (disambiguation)